Joseph Lawson may refer to:

 Joseph Lawson (cricketer) (1893–1969), English cricketer who played one first-class match for Gloucestershire
 Joseph Lawson (trainer) (1881–1964), British racehorse trainer
 Joseph William Lawson (1844–1920), English organist and composer

See also 
 Joe Lawson (disambiguation)